Darwish Rasooli (born 12 December 1999) is an Afghan cricketer. He made his international debut for the Afghanistan cricket team in March 2022.

Domestic career
He made his List A debut for Speen Ghar Region in the 2017 Ghazi Amanullah Khan Regional One Day Tournament on 13 August 2017. Three days later, in his second List A match, he scored his first century, when he made 130 not out against Amo Region. He made his Twenty20 debut for Mis Ainak Knights in the 2017 Shpageeza Cricket League on 14 September 2017.

He was the leading run-scorer in the 2018 Ahmad Shah Abdali 4-day Tournament, finishing with 1,073 runs in eight matches. In September 2018, he was named in Balkh's squad in the first edition of the Afghanistan Premier League tournament.

International career
In December 2017, he was named in Afghanistan's squad for the 2018 Under-19 Cricket World Cup.

In May 2018, he was named in Afghanistan's Twenty20 International (T20I) squad for their series against Bangladesh. In December 2018, he was named in Afghanistan's under-23 team for the 2018 ACC Emerging Teams Asia Cup. In November 2019, he was named in Afghanistan's squad for the 2019 ACC Emerging Teams Asia Cup in Bangladesh.

In February 2022, he was named in Afghanistan's Twenty20 International (T20I) squad for their series against Bangladesh. He made his T20I debut on 3 March 2022, for Afghanistan against Bangladesh.

References

External links
 

1999 births
Living people
Afghan cricketers
Afghanistan Twenty20 International cricketers
Balkh Legends cricketers
Mis Ainak Knights cricketers
Spin Ghar Tigers cricketers
Place of birth missing (living people)